Mark Edward Tucker (born 29 December 1957) is an English businessman, best known for his various roles at Prudential plc, where he was the CEO until September 2009. He currently serves as group chairman of HSBC Holdings plc.

Early life
Mark Tucker started adult life as a trainee professional footballer, making appearances for Wolverhampton Wanderers, Rochdale and Barnet, although he never played a first team match.

Career History
After retiring from professional football, Tucker studied Business Management at the University of Leeds. He then qualified as an accountant at PricewaterhouseCoopers.

He joined Prudential plc in 1986, initially working for Prudential Portfolio Managers. He progressed through various roles in the UK, Hong Kong, and the US, where he was a senior vice president at Jackson National Life from 1992 to 1993.  He was appointed Chief Executive of Prudential Corporation Asia and an executive director of Prudential plc, but left the group in May 2004 after growing frustrated at the lack of upward opportunity at Prudential to join HBOS as finance director.

Following Jonathan Bloomer's ousting as CEO of Prudential in early 2005, due to bungled attempts to merge with American General and sell off Egg, Tucker rejoined Prudential in March 2005 as CEO. In March 2009 it was announced he will step down at the end of September 2009, Tucker stating he had achieved all that he wanted to achieve in the role and the decision to leave was "entirely personal". He does not intend to retire, stating "There’s at least one more big job in me". Tucker is a member of the Board of Directors of Goldman Sachs. He served as the CEO and president of Asian focus insurer AIA Group from June 2009 to September 2017, where he successfully led the former Asian assurance arm of New York-based American International Group (AIG) for an IPO on the Hong Kong Stock Exchange in October 2010. It raised approximately HK$159.08 billion (US$20.51 billion), the world's third largest IPO ever.

Mark Tucker was appointed to the board as a non-executive director and group chairman-designate of HSBC Holdings plc on 1 September 2017. He became non-executive group chairman on 1 October 2017, succeeding executive chairman Douglas Flint, who retired.

In June 2019, Mark Tucker was appointed board chairman of the private-sector membership body and industry advocacy group TheCityUK, succeeding John McFarlane.

In February 2023, he was named a member of the McKinsey & Company External Advisory Group.

Personal life
Tucker is married with one son and one daughter. During Tucker's time with AIA, the company became Premier League team Tottenham Hotspur's shirt main sponsor.

References

1957 births
Living people
British chairpersons of corporations
Chairmen of HSBC
Prudential plc people
Directors of Goldman Sachs
Alumni of the University of Leeds
Peterson Institute for International Economics